Mustafa Culha (Çulha) is a full professor Chemistry and  the founder of Nanobiotechnology and Molecular Engineering Research Group  which he established in 2004. He is currently undertaking research for early cancer detection  at the Knight Cancer Institute  of Oregon Health and Science University. Prof. Culha has significant contributions for the biomedical applications of Surface-enhanced Raman Scattering (SERS), better understanding of surface chemistry versus toxicity relationship of nanomaterials, and synthesis and biomedical applications of boron nitride nanomaterials including boron nitride nanotubes (BNNTs) and hexagonal boron nitrides (hBNs). He continues to explore these and related fields to help the humanity to overcome the biggest challenges in disease detection, diagnosis and treatment.

References

External links
Official University CV
http://www.nanowerk.com/spotlight/spotid=15715.php
http://www.nanowerk.com/spotlight/spotid=26690.php
https://link.springer.com/article/10.1007/s00216-015-9033-3

Turkish biochemists
Living people
Year of birth missing (living people)
Academic staff of Yeditepe University